Steve Meakin (born July 19, 1961) is a former professional snooker player. He played on the World Snooker Tour between 1988 and 1996.

Career
Meakin reached the Final of a non-ranking WPBSA Tournament in 1988 but lost to David Taylor. Meakin suffered a loss against Dubliner Paddy Browne at the 1989 World Snooker Championship, from 8-1 up in the final qualifying round before The Crucible, he lost 10-9. He reached the round of the Last 48 at the Dubai Classic in 1993 which included a victory over world number 33 Silvino Francisco. The same year he reached the last 32 of the Benson & Hedges Championship.

At the 2000 Benson and Hedges Championship his opponent David McLellan scored a 147 at the Willie Thorne Snooker Club in Malvern.

Personal life
From Blackpool, Meakin would practise at the Commonwealth Club. He was also a member at the Layton Institute. He returned to Lancashire after dropping off the tour and continued to play local snooker events. Meakin has competed in Seniors events also.

References

Living people
1961 births